Hugo Neumann (25 October 1858 – 12 July 1912) was a German-Jewish pediatrician born in Berlin.

He studied medicine in Berlin and Heidelberg, receiving his doctorate with a thesis titled Über die Knochenbrüche bei Geisteskranken. From 1884 he worked as an assistant to Paul Guttmann (1834–1893) at the Hospital Moabit in Berlin. In 1887 he founded a private clinic for childhood diseases in Berlin.

Written works 
 Öffentlicher Kinderschutz volume  7: Schulhygiene und öffentlicher Kinderschutz Abt. 2. Coblentz, Berlin 1895, S. 431–687.
 Über die Beziehungen der Krankheiten des Kindesalters zu den Zahnkrankheiten. Breitkopf & Härtel, Leipzig 1897. 
 Öffentliche Säuglings- und Kinderfürsorge. Allg. Med. Verl. Anst., Berlin 1909. (Public infant and child welfare)
 Die unehelichen Kinder in Berlin. Fischer, Jena 1900. (The illegitimate children in Berlin)
 Über die Behandlung der Kinderkrankheiten: H. Neumanns Briefe an einen jungen Arzt. Coblentz, Berlin 1913. (On the treatment of childhood diseases: Hugo Neumann's letters to a young doctor)
 Books about Hugo Neumann:
 "Dr. Hugo Neumann: Ein Pionier der sozialen Kinderheilkunde"  by Gerrit Kirchner (2008).

References 
 Biographical information based on a translation of the Neumann (Familie) at the German Wikipedia.

German pediatricians
Physicians from Berlin
1858 births
1912 deaths